Iodopindolol is a beta-adrenergic selective antagonist tagged with radioactive iodine-125. It has been used to map beta receptors in cellular experiments.

See also 
 Pindolol

References 

Beta blockers
Radiopharmaceuticals
Organoiodides
Isopropylamino compounds
N-isopropyl-phenoxypropanolamines
Indoles